The 2018 Lilly Diabetes 250 was a NASCAR Xfinity Series race held on September 10, 2018 at Indianapolis Motor Speedway in Speedway, Indiana. Contested over 100 laps on the  speedway, it was the 25th race of the 2018 NASCAR Xfinity Series season.

Entry list

Practice
Both practice sessions for the race were cancelled due to rain.

Qualifying
Qualifying for the race was cancelled due to rain. Ryan Blaney won the pole based on owner's points.

Starting lineup

Race

Stage Results

Stage 1

Stage 2

Final Stage Results

Stage 3

References

Lilly Diabetes 250
NASCAR races at Indianapolis Motor Speedway
Lilly Diabetes 250
2018 NASCAR Xfinity Series